Pieter van der Does (1562 – 24 October 1599) was a Dutch admiral. He was the son of Jacob van der Does (c.1500-1577), schepen of Leiden during its siege.

Life
Pieter van der Does was born in Leiden.  In 1586 he became superintendent of the Dutch fleet which witnessed the defeat of the Spanish Armada two years later. In 1588 he was wounded at the siege of Geertruidenberg. In 1587 he was also bailiff and dijkgraaf of the Rijnland water board, and in 1588 chief schout of Leiden. On 23 December 1588 he received the post of vice-admiral of west Holland, and some time later he was also master-general of the artillery. In 1594 he was wounded during the siege of Groningen. For his services the States of Holland and West Friesland granted him the fiefdoms of Vriesekoop and Rijnsaterwoude and the title of jonkheer.

In 1597 he was vice-admiral in the Admiralty of the Maze and in 1599 a vice-admiral in the Admiralty of Amsterdam. In May 1599 he led a Dutch and Zeeland fleet which set out to blockade the Iberian coast as part of the Eighty Years' War. En route they attacked the Spanish possession of Las Palmas de Gran Canaria, but this was heavily defended and the attack was unsuccessful. It then moved to attack Spanish possessions in West Africa around Sao Tomé, where Van der Does died, either of wounds received at Las Palmas or of malaria.

Bibliography
Ebben, M.A., De aanval van Pieter van der Does op Las Palmas de Gran Canaria (1599) en de Nederlandse expansie rond 1600, 1999
Lem, A. van der, Ebben, M.A., Fagel, R.P. & Sicking, L.H.J. (Ed.), De Opstand in de Nederlanden, 1555–1609

Admirals of the navy of the Dutch Republic
1562 births
1599 deaths
People from Leiden
16th-century Dutch people
16th-century Dutch military personnel